Paul Leo Molitor (born August 22, 1956), nicknamed "Molly" and "the Ignitor", is an American former Major League Baseball (MLB) player and former manager of the Minnesota Twins, who is in the Baseball Hall of Fame. During his 21-year baseball career, he played for the Milwaukee Brewers (1978–1992), Toronto Blue Jays (1993–1995), and Minnesota Twins (1996–1998). He was known for his exceptional hitting and speed. He made seven All-Star Game appearances, and was the World Series MVP in 1993. Molitor currently ranks tenth on the all-time MLB career hits list with 3,319. He is one of only five players in history with 3,000+ hits, a lifetime .300+ batting average and 500+ career stolen bases.

Molitor grew up in Minnesota and attended the University of Minnesota before beginning his MLB career. Molitor served as a coach for the Seattle Mariners and the Twins after his retirement as a player. In 2004, he was elected to the Hall of Fame in his first year of eligibility, becoming one of the first players enshrined after spending a significant portion of his career as a designated hitter. He was a finalist for the Major League Baseball All-Century Team. On November 3, 2014, Molitor was announced as the 13th manager of the Minnesota Twins.  He managed the team for four seasons, and was fired in October 2018.

Early life
Molitor was born in Saint Paul, Minnesota.  After graduating from Cretin High School, he was selected in the 28th round of the 1974 MLB draft as a pitcher by the St. Louis Cardinals. He opted instead to attend college at the University of Minnesota, where he was a three-year starter for the Minnesota Golden Gophers. Molitor earned All-American honors as a shortstop for his sophomore year. Between his sophomore and junior seasons, Molitor suffered a broken jaw. With his jaw wired shut for eight weeks, Molitor lost .

After his junior year in college, the Milwaukee Brewers selected Molitor in the first round, with the third overall selection, in the 1977 Major League Baseball draft. He signed with the Brewers and began his professional career with the Class A Burlington Bees of the Midwest League. In 64 games with Burlington, Molitor hit for a .346 batting average, 8 home runs, 50 runs batted in (RBI) and 14 stolen bases.

Playing career

Milwaukee Brewers (1978–1992)
Molitor began as a shortstop, then moved to second base when Robin Yount returned from a brief injury. He made his MLB debut in 1978, playing in 125 games and hitting .273 with six home runs, 45 RBIs and 30 stolen bases. In 1981, he spent time at center field and right field to avoid the injuries associated with infield play. Molitor was moved to third base before the 1982 season. Molitor was part of a young Milwaukee Brewers team that lost the 1982 World Series in seven games to the St. Louis Cardinals. Molitor batted .355 during the series. In Game 1, he had five hits, a World Series record. During the 1982 season, he hit .302 and led the American League (AL) with 136 runs scored. On May 12, he hit three home runs against the Royals in a 9-7 loss.

Molitor struggled with injuries for much of his early career, being placed on the disabled list six times between 1980 and 1986. In 1984, Molitor struggled with elbow problems, played in only 13 games and ultimately underwent surgery in an attempt to salvage his career. He played in 140 games in 1985, hitting .297 with 10 home runs and 48 RBIs. He followed that with a .281 average, 9 home runs and 55 RBI in 1986. That year he suffered a hamstring injury, returned for a few days, then reinjured it. He played in 105 games that season.

Molitor attracted national media attention in 1987 during his 39-game hitting streak. Near the end of the streak, columnist Mike Downey wrote that "the amazing thing about Paul Molitor's recent bat-o-rama is not that he has hit in 33 straight games but that he has played in 33 straight games." The streak ended with Molitor in the on-deck circle when Rick Manning got a game-ending hit to beat the Cleveland Indians on August 26, 1987. Fans booed Manning for driving in the winning run and thus depriving Molitor of one last chance to reach 40 games. The streak stands as the fifth-longest in modern-day baseball history, and remains the longest since Pete Rose's 44-game hit streak in 1978.

Toronto Blue Jays (1993–1995)

Although Molitor wanted to remain with Milwaukee when he became a free agent after the 1992 season, the franchise offered him a one-year contract with a $900,000 pay cut (to $2.5 million), while the Toronto Blue Jays offered a three-year, $13 million deal (equivalent to $ million in ), leading to his signing with the Blue Jays. Agent Ron Simon said, "I was also talking with Milwaukee, but it became clear to us that Milwaukee didn't have the same kind of interest in signing Molitor, perhaps because of their financial situation."

Molitor quickly became an offensive juggernaut. In 1993, Molitor led the AL in plate appearances (725) and hits (211) and hit .332 with 22 home runs and 111 RBI. Returning to the playoffs for the first time since 1982, he was a key part of the Blue Jays' second World Championship. Molitor hit 2 doubles, 2 triples, and 2 home runs in the Series, earning the World Series MVP Award and tied a World Series record by batting .500 (12-for-24) in the six-game series. In addition, after playing as a DH all season, Molitor played Game 3 of the World Series at first base and Games 4 and 5 at third base in the games played at Philadelphia.

In 1994, a strike-shortened season, Molitor hit .341 and led the AL in games played (115) and singles (107). He also stole 20 bases that season without ever being caught, one short of Kevin McReynolds' 1988 major league record of 21. Molitor's average dropped to .270 in 1995, his lowest mark in more than ten years.

Minnesota Twins (1996–1998)
He left the Blue Jays after the  season, and joined his hometown Minnesota Twins for the final three seasons of his career, where he acquired his 3,000th hit. He was the first player to reach the 3,000 hits plateau with a triple. Molitor was relishing the opportunity to play with Twins superstar Kirby Puckett, but Puckett developed career-ending glaucoma during spring training in 1996 and never played again. In 1996, Molitor became the second 40-year-old, after Hall of Famer Sam Rice, to have a 200-hit season, leading the league with 225, while also leading the league in singles with 167. Molitor also remains the last MLB player to drive in 100 or more runs in a season while hitting fewer than 10 home runs (9 HR, 113 RBIs).

Molitor hit .305 in 1997, his twelfth season to finish with a batting average higher than .300. In 1998, he hit .281 with 4 home runs, 69 RBI and 9 stolen bases. Other than his very brief 1984 season, the 1998 season was the first in Molitor's career in which he did not reach double-digit stolen base totals. He retired in December, saying, "My heart tells me I've done what I can do on the field and in this game", Molitor said. "I'm happy to leave it playing my last season in a Twins uniform... Now I'm going to redirect my efforts to find out what else the future holds."

Coaching and managerial career

Early career
After retiring as a player, Molitor remained with the Twins as a bench coach for three seasons. He was considered a leading candidate to manage the team when Tom Kelly retired after 2001, but he declined in part because the Twins were still being targeted for potential contraction. Molitor was a hitting coach with the Mariners in 2004. He then spent the 2005 to 2013 seasons in the Twins organization as a minor league baserunning and fielding instructor. Molitor joined the Twins coaching staff in 2014 to oversee baserunning, bunting, infield instruction, and positioning.

Minnesota Twins
The Twins hired Molitor to fill their manager vacancy for the 2015 season, and introduced him in a press conference on November 4, 2014.
At the end of the 2017 season, the Twins announced that Molitor would receive a three-year contract extension through 2020. Molitor was rewarded for his efforts in leading the Twins back to the postseason after losing 103 games the season prior, the first team in history to achieve this feat, by being named American League Manager of the Year in November 2017. He became only the second person to be elected to the Hall of Fame as a player and win the Manager of the Year Award behind Frank Robinson, who was named AL Manager of the Year in 1989 while managing the Baltimore Orioles.
On October 2, 2018, the Twins fired Molitor as manager, but expressed that they had interest in having him continue to maintain a role with the team in some capacity. He finished with a record of 305 wins and 343 losses in 648 games. Molitor later rejoined the Twins as a special assistant, with roving instructor duties for the team's minor league affiliates.

Managerial record

Accomplishments

Molitor's lifetime statistics include 2,683 games played, 1,782 runs scored, 3,319 hits, 605 doubles, 114 triples, 234 home runs, 1,307 runs batted in, 1,094 walks, a .306 batting average, and 504 stolen bases. His 3,319 hits rank him ninth all-time. In addition, he batted .368 in five postseason series, and was an all-star seven times. Molitor recorded these statistics while missing nearly 500 games due to various injuries throughout his career. In 1999, Molitor ranked No. 99 on The Sporting News' list of the 100 Greatest Baseball Players, and he was nominated as a finalist for the Major League Baseball All-Century Team. Molitor was elected to the Wisconsin Athletic Hall of Fame in 1999.

On June 11, 1999, the Brewers retired Molitor's uniform number 4. During the ceremony at Milwaukee County Stadium, Molitor announced that if he went into the Hall of Fame, he would do so as a Brewer. On January 6, 2004, he was elected to the Hall in his first year of eligibility, with 85.2% of the votes. True to his word, he joined Robin Yount as the only Hall of Famers to be depicted on their plaques with Brewers caps. At the time of his induction, Molitor was the hitting coach for the Seattle Mariners.

Molitor is one of five players in major league history with at least 3,000 hits, a .300 lifetime batting average, and 500 stolen bases. The other four are Ty Cobb, Honus Wagner, Eddie Collins and Ichiro Suzuki. Only Ichiro and Molitor played beyond 1930. Molitor is the only player ever to accomplish those feats and hit at least 200 home runs. Molitor is also the first player in World Series history to have at least two home runs, two doubles, and two triples in one series (1993). He is a member of an exclusive club, hitting .300 or better in full seasons across three decades (1970s, 80s, and 90s). He hit better than .300 a dozen times in his career. Including Game 1 of the 1982 World Series, he recorded eight 5-hit games and four 200+ hit seasons in his 21 year major league career.

As of 2021, Molitor is the last Major League player to execute the rare feat of stealing home plate at least ten times over the course of a career.

Personal life
During the early years of his career, Molitor began using cocaine and marijuana. During the trial of a drug dealer in 1984, Molitor admitted that he had used drugs. Many years later, he said, "There are things you're not so proud of — failures, mistakes, dabbling in drugs, a young ballplayer in the party scene. Part of it was peer pressure. I was young and single, and hung around with the wrong people. ... You learn from it. You find a positive in it. It makes you appreciate the things that are good." He claims to have stopped using drugs in 1981, and has since visited schools to lecture about the dangers of drug use.

Molitor married Linda Kaplan in 1981, and before their 2003 divorce it was revealed he had fathered a son in an extramarital affair with Joanna Andreou and was paying child support. During his legal separation from Linda, he fathered another child with the woman who would become his second wife, Destini; they later had a third child together. During his Hall of Fame induction speech, Molitor mentioned his difficult family relationships; the divorce from Linda caused such hard feelings that his ex-wife and daughter almost did not attend his induction ceremony.

Molitor's nephew is professional disc golfer Cale Leiviska.

See also
 List of Major League Baseball career home run leaders
 List of Major League Baseball hit records
 List of Major League Baseball doubles records
 List of Major League Baseball career hits leaders
 List of Major League Baseball career doubles leaders
 List of Major League Baseball career triples leaders
 List of Major League Baseball career runs scored leaders
 List of Major League Baseball career stolen bases leaders
 3,000 hit club
 List of Major League Baseball players to hit for the cycle
 List of Major League Baseball annual runs scored leaders
 List of Major League Baseball annual doubles leaders
 List of Major League Baseball annual triples leaders
 List of Major League Baseball career stolen bases leaders

References

Further reading

External links

1956 births
Living people
All-American college baseball players
American expatriate baseball players in Canada
American League All-Stars
Baseball coaches from Minnesota
Baseball players from Saint Paul, Minnesota
Beloit Brewers players
Burlington Bees players
Major League Baseball bench coaches
Major League Baseball designated hitters
Major League Baseball first basemen
Major League Baseball players with retired numbers
Major League Baseball third basemen
Manager of the Year Award winners
Minnesota Twins coaches
Minnesota Twins managers
Milwaukee Brewers players
Minnesota Golden Gophers baseball players
Minnesota Twins players
National Baseball Hall of Fame inductees
National College Baseball Hall of Fame inductees
Salt Lake Buzz players
Seattle Mariners coaches
Silver Slugger Award winners
Toronto Blue Jays players
World Series Most Valuable Player Award winners